The Long Branch Stakes is an American Thoroughbred horse race held annually at Monmouth Park Racetrack in Oceanport, New Jersey. Open to three-year-olds, it is contested on dirt over a distance of  miles (8.5 furlongs). It is generally viewed as a  prep race for the Haskell Invitational. The race is named after nearby Long Branch, New Jersey.

First run in 1878, it was raced annually through 1893 as the Long Branch Handicap after which the race track closed its gates. The race was revived in 1947, following the 1946 reopening of the new Monmouth Park. The race was discontinued after the 1958 running—as a handicap, it was not drawing large fields. In 1963, it was restarted as the Long Branch Stakes.

Past winners
The race was run annually from 1878 to 1893 (16 editions), and was later run annually from 1947 to 1958 (12 editions). After a four-year hiatus, the race was resumed in 1963, and has been run annually since then. The 2019 running was the 85th edition of the race.

1963–present
Since being resumed in 1963, the race has been open to three-year-olds. In 1963, the distance was three-quarters of a mile (six furlongs). From 1964 through 1989, the distance was one mile, some years run on dirt and some years run on turf. Since 1990, the race has been run at a  mile distance on dirt.

 2019 – Joevia (Nik Juarez)
 2018 – Navy Commander (Ángel Arroyo)
 2017 – Phat Man (Wilmer Garcia)
 2016 – No Distortion (Gabriel Saez)
 2015 – Stanford (Joe Bravo)
 2014 – Irish You Well (Orlando Bacochica)
 2013 – Micromanage (Joe Bravo)
 2012 – My Adonis (Elvis Trujillo)
 2011 – Rattlesnake Bridge (Eddie Castro)
 2010 – Trappe Shot (Alan Garcia)
 2009 – Atomic Rain (Joe Bravo)
 2008 – Truth Rules (Stewart Elliott)
 2007 – First Defence (Javier Castellano)
 2006 – Praying for Cash (José A. Vélez Jr.)
 2005 – Park Avenue Ball (Chris DeCarlo)
 2004 – Lion Heart (Joe Bravo)
 2003 – Max Forever (José C. Ferrer)
 2002 – Puck (Manuel Aguilar)
 2001 – Burning Roma (Rick Wilson)
 2000 – Thistyranthasclass (José A. Vélez Jr.)
 1999 – Ghost Story
 1998 – Favorite Trick
 1997 – Jules (sire of Peace Rules)
 1996 – Dr. Caton
 1995 – Pyramid Peak
 1994 – Meadow Flight
 1993 – Bert's Bubbleator
 1992 – Scudan (By 13 3/4 lengths over odds-on choice)
 1991 – Sultry Song
 1990 – Tees Prospect
 1989 – Orange Sunshine
 1988 – Mi Selecto
 1987 – I'm So Bad
 1986 – Lyphard Line
 1985 – Bea Quality
 1984 – Dr Schwarztsman
 1983 – Smart Style (1st division), Princilian (2nd division)
 1982 – Prince Westport (1st division), Play for Love (2nd division)
 1981 – De La Rose (filly)
 1980 – No Bend
 1979 – Commodore
 1978 – Mac Diarmida
 1977 – P R Man
 1976 – Pastry
 1975 – Lee Gary
 1974 – Silver Florin (1st Division), Hat Full (2nd Division)
 1973 – Bemo
 1972 – Deep Cut
 1971 – Gleaming
 1970 – Summer Resort
 1969 – North Flight
 1968 – Royal Trace
 1967 – Blasting Charge (1st Division), Fort Marcy (2nd Division)
 1966 – Assagai
 1965 – Carry Forward
 1964 – Phantom Shot
 1963 – Gray Pet (Steve Brooks)

Mid-20th century
These races were run over a distance of  miles, open to three-year-olds and up.

 1958 – Little Hermit (Karl Korte)
 1957 – Beau Fond (Howard Grant)
 1956 – Skipper Bill (Joe Regalbuto)
 1955 – Revolt (Henry Moreno)
 1954 – Brown Booter (Bill Hartack)
 1953 – Bit O Fate (Nick Shuk)
 1952 – General Staff (James Stout)
 1951 – Sheilas Reward (Dave Gorman)
 1950 – Reveille (Ovie Scurlock)
 1949 – Whirling Fox (Bobby Bernhardt)
 1948 – Beauchef (Ruperto Donoso)
 1947 – Polynesian (W. D. Wright)

19th century
These races were run at a distance of  mile (10 furlongs), and not restricted to three-year-olds.

 1893 – Candelabra
 1892 – Demuth
 1891 – Eon
 1890 – Reporter
 1889 – Tarragon
 1888 – Belvidere
 1887 – Hidalgo
 1886 – Rupert
 1885 – Richmond
 1884 – Eolist
 1883 – Monitor
 1882 – Monitor
 1881 – Ripple
 1880 – Report
 1879 – Jericho
 1878 – Little Reb

References

External links
 Long Branch Stakes archive at paulickreport.com

Horse races in New Jersey
Graded stakes races in the United States
Flat horse races for three-year-olds
Recurring sporting events established in 1878
Monmouth Park Racetrack
1878 establishments in New Jersey